Jermaine Maurice Jackson Sr. (born June 7, 1976) is an American former professional basketball player who most recently served as head coach for SPIRE Institute in Geneva, Ohio.

Early life
Born and raised in Detroit, Michigan, Jackson graduated from Finney High School of Detroit in 1995. At the University of Detroit Mercy, Jackson played four seasons on the Detroit Titans men's basketball team. Considered one of the Top 50 Midwestern Collegiate Conference / Horizon League Players from (1994-2012).

Professional career
Jackson was undrafted in 1999 following a college career at the University of Detroit Mercy and began his professional career with the Detroit Pistons (1999-00), going on to play for the Toronto Raptors (2002–03), Atlanta Hawks (2003) and New York Knicks (2005), averaging 2.2 points, 1.1 rebounds and 1.5 assists per game in his NBA career. The Knicks included Jackson in a trade along with Mike Sweetney and Tim Thomas in exchange for Antonio Davis and Eddy Curry of the Chicago Bulls. He was cut by the Bulls on October 18, 2005, and was signed by the Milwaukee Bucks on December 15, 2005. He played for the Bucks in the 2005–06 season, with the team renouncing their NBA rights to him on July 19, 2007. Jackson signed with the Seattle SuperSonics on October 1, and was waived during that month.

He also played professionally in the CBA, as well as in Europe for a number of teams, winning the 2004 Italian Cup with Benetton Treviso.

In January 2011 he signed with Maccabi Haifa B.C. in Israel. Maccabi released him in March 2012. While with Maccabi, Jackson played in the Israeli Basketball Super League All-Star Game in 2012.

NBA career statistics

Regular season

|-
| align="left" | 1999–00
| align="left" | Detroit
| 7 || 0 || 10.4 || .091 || .000 || .625 || 1.6 || 0.6 || 0.4 || 0.0 || 1.0
|-
| align="left" | 2001–02
| align="left" | Toronto
| 24 || 0 || 11.7 || .476 || .500 || .667 || 1.1 || 2.4 || 0.4 || 0.0 || 2.4
|-
| align="left" | 2002–03
| align="left" | Toronto
| 24 || 1 || 11.9 || .309 || .111 || .852 || 1.0 || 1.6 || 0.4 || 0.1 || 2.8
|-
| align="left" | 2002–03
| align="left" | Atlanta
| 29 || 0 || 9.4 || .452 || .000 || .607 || 1.1 || 1.2 || 0.3 || 0.1 || 1.9
|-
| align="left" | 2004–05
| align="left" | New York
| 21 || 0 || 11.0 || .515 || .000 || .615 || 1.1 || 1.1 || 0.3 || 0.0 || 2.0
|-
| align="left" | 2005–06
| align="left" | Milwaukee
| 30 || 2 || 6.7 || .423 || .250 || .857 || 0.9 || 0.8 || 0.1 || 0.0 || 1.2
|- class="sortbottom"
| style="text-align:center;" colspan="2"| Career
| 135 || 3 || 10.0 || .401 || .158 || .711 || 1.1 || 1.4 || 0.3 || 0.1 || 1.9
|}

Playoffs

|-
| align="left" | 2001–02
| align="left" | Toronto
| 4 || 0 || 3.0 || .667 || .000 || .333 || 0.3 || 0.0 || 0.0 || 0.0 || 1.5
|-
| align="left" | 2005–06
| align="left" | Milwaukee
| 2 || 0 || 2.0 || .000 || .000 || .000 || 0.0 || 1.0 || 0.0 || 0.0 || 0.0
|- class="sortbottom"
| style="text-align:center;" colspan="2"| Career
| 6 || 0 || 2.7 || .400 || .000 || .333 || 0.2 || 0.3 || 0.0 || 0.0 || 1.0
|}

Post-playing career
Jermaine Jackson returned to Michigan after being released from Maccabi Haifa and opened the Jermaine Jackson-Cairns Community Center in Mount Clemens in May. The community center also includes the Jermaine Jackson Academy for youth basketball instruction. Jackson also that year became the boys' basketball coach at Mount Clemens High School.

On June 29, 2015, Jackson was named Assistant Men's Basketball Coach for University of Detroit Mercy. After the dismissal of UDM head coach Ray McCallum in the spring of 2016, Jackson was appointed interim head coach until the Titans hired Bacari Alexander who kept Jackson on staff as the lead associate.

In late June 2018, Jackson joined SPIRE Institute, a prep school in Geneva, Ohio, as the head basketball coach. During his first season, one of the players he coached was LaMelo Ball, a player who previously played professionally in Lithuania, as well as in his father's Junior Basketball Association. Jackson was named Coach of the Year of The Grind Session during his tenure with Spire.

More recently he has become LaMelo Ball's manager.

Personal life
Jackson's cousin, Brandon Jenkins, is also a professional basketballer. He currently plays in Switzerland for BC Boncourt.

Jackson's son, Jermaine Jr., is also a basketball player who is committed to play at his father's alma mater and former school of employment, the University of Detroit Mercy under head coach and close family friend Bacari Alexander.

References

External links

NBA.com Profile - Jermaine Jackson
Career moves at hoopshype.com

1976 births
Living people
African-American basketball players
American expatriate basketball people in Canada
American expatriate basketball people in Greece
American expatriate basketball people in Israel
American expatriate basketball people in Italy
American expatriate basketball people in Lithuania
American expatriate basketball people in Spain
American expatriate basketball people in Ukraine
American men's basketball players
Aris B.C. players
Atlanta Hawks players
Baloncesto León players
Basketball players from Detroit
BC Azovmash players
Detroit Pistons players
Detroit Mercy Titans men's basketball players
Flint Fuze players
Great Lakes Storm players
High school basketball coaches in Michigan
High school basketball coaches in Ohio
Liga ACB players
Maccabi Haifa B.C. players
Milwaukee Bucks players
New York Knicks players
Pallalcesto Amatori Udine players
Pallacanestro Treviso players
Point guards
Quad City Thunder players
Shooting guards
Toronto Raptors players
Undrafted National Basketball Association players
Valencia Basket players
Yakima Sun Kings players
United States Basketball League players
21st-century African-American sportspeople
20th-century African-American sportspeople